Benon Mugumbya is a Ugandan musician and music producer. He was one half of the singing duo "Benon and Vamposs". He is the founder of Swangz Avenue.

Early life and education
Benon Mugumbya was born in 1981 to Benon Mugumbya and Florence Mugumbya. His father died two weeks before he was born. He went to Budo Junior Primary School, Ndejje Secondary school for ordinary level and Namasagali Colvalege for advanced level.

Music
Benon first made his name under a music duo Benon and Vamposs. The duo started doing music in 2000. The duo had successful songs like "Mumulete", "I know", "Nsazewo", and "My lady". The video for their song "Mumuleete" made it to the top ten on MTV chart in UK.  In 2009, Vampino opted for a solo career as Benon concentrated on music production. He has had successful singles like "Ani yali amanyi" originally done by Elly Wamala, "Hope", "Owana lwaki akaaba" and "Singa Kisoboka".

Discography
Olunaku Olupya (A new day)

Benon and Vamposs
Extra, Extra Large, 2007

References 

1980 births
21st-century Ugandan male singers
Living people
People from Kampala
Kumusha